Dictyocephalos is a genus of fungi in the family Phelloriniaceae of the order Agaricales. The genus is monotypic, and contains the single species Dictyocephalos attenuatus, described by the American botanist Lucien Marcus Underwood in 1901 (as D. curvatus).

References

External links

Agaricales
Monotypic Agaricales genera